Bleach: Brave Souls is a free-to-play beat 'em up video game developed and published by KLabGames. Set in the Bleach universe, it was released for Android and iOS in Japan in July 2015 and worldwide in January 2016. It released for Windows in August 2020 and for PlayStation 4 in March 2022. The game reported 70 million downloads by May 2022.

Development 
A Japanese version was published on July 23, 2015, and an English-language version on January 13, 2016.

Gameplay 
The game is a real-time, beat 'em up action game with role-playing elements, featuring modes such as story and coop (PvE) and PVP. The game is free-to-play with options to purchase in-game items to speed up one's progress.

It features hundreds of collectible characters which can be leveled up and used in combat. Bleach series creator Tite Kubo has designed images for several unique character versions for the game, including ones related to the official spinoff sequel Can't Fear Your Own World, a story which is also serialized in the game. The game also includes characters and storylines from the final arc of the Bleach manga, Thousand-Year Blood War, which received an anime adaptation in 2022. The game features music from the J-pop band Hello Sleepwalkers.

Reception 
The game received relatively positive reviews. Wellplayed wrote: "For a free-to-download mobile game, Bleach: Brave Souls offers an impressive array of content that will keep you entertained for longer than it has any right to do", Droid Gamers said: "Even if one is unfamiliar with the Bleach property, Brave Souls stands well enough on its own as a top-notch hack-n-slash with light RPG elements, that the game comes recommended to gamers of all types and not just fans of the anime". Digitally Downloaded concluded that "Brave Souls isn't the finest anime game out there, but I believe it can be. Even in its bumpy, jagged state, KLab has managed to boil the franchise down to its most appealing elements and turn an intimidating multi-hundred chapter mess into something newcomers can actually parse". One of those early reviews which offered a scale ranked the game as 4 out 5. The Gamer's Library reviewer, while noting that they enjoy the game and plan on playing it, cautioned that it is rather repetitive.

References

External links

Brave Souls
2015 video games
Android (operating system) games
Gacha games
Free-to-play video games
IOS games
Japanese role-playing video games
Multiplayer and single-player video games
Video games developed in Japan
Windows games
PlayStation 4 games